Events in the year 1650 in Norway.

Incumbents
Monarch: Frederick III

Events
Åsgårdstrand is given town status (under Tønsberg).

Arts and literature

Births
Anders Been, painter and court dwarf  (died 1739).
Hans Hansen Lilienskiold, jurist, government official and civil servant (died 1703).
Christian Frederik Powisch, government official (died 1711).

Deaths

References